KBXX (97.9 FM) is a commercial radio station in Houston, Texas.  It airs a rhythmic contemporary radio format, mostly made up of hip-hop music and R&B.  It is owned by Urban One as part of a three-station cluster with KMJQ and KROI.  The studios and offices are located in the Greenway Plaza district.

KBXX has an effective radiated power (ERP) of 100,000 watts.  The transmitter is on Farm to Market Road 2234, near Fort Bend Parkway in Southwest Houston.  It broadcasts in the HD Radio hybrid format.

Previously, the HD2 subchannel aired Vietnamese language programming, both talk and pop music. KBXX-HD2 provided the primary feed for FM translator 101.7 K269GT in Humble.

History

As KFMK
The station originally signed on in 1958 with a popular music format as KFMK, but later migrated to a classical music format. By 1967, KFMK moved to a Top 40 format, competing against KRBE and had a slight advantage over KRBE because it was in stereo, although the latter had a stronger signal at the time.

By May 1968, KFMK transitioned to become Houston's first progressive rock station, known as "Mother Radio" (a name later referenced by KLOL, which was known as "Mother's Family"). In early 1969, KFMK abruptly changed to a Christian format. The station reverted to Top 40 in the late 1970s, which would then transition to an Oldies-oriented AC format in the 1980s. This hybrid format lasted until the station flipped to its current format.

As KBXX
On April 2, 1991, after a period of stunting, the station flipped to "The Box" with a new rhythmic contemporary format (alternatively referred to as "contemporary crossover" in the early years). The new KBXX callsign was implemented on April 22, 1991.  It fiercely competed with longtime heritage urban station KMJQ until Clear Channel Communications bought KBXX in late 1994, then paired it with KMJQ the year after.

Despite being rhythmic, KBXX's music selection moved more toward a mainstream urban direction, focusing on hip hop and R&B music.  Clear Channel spun off KBXX and KMJQ to Radio One in 2000.

The morning show had been hosted by Madd Hatta since March 2001.  He had been on KBXX since 1995, starting off in afternoons, before switching to morning drive time. In December 2019, Madd Hatta left the station; the following month, he was replaced with "Good Morning H-Town", hosted initially by Jerrel 'Hardbody Kiotti' Brown and Keisha Nicole; Kiotti would be replaced by former Madd Hatta Show co-host James 'J Mac' Garrett.

Programming
KBXX was moved to R&R's Urban Contemporary Airplay panel in 2006, however it still remains on Mediabase's Rhythmic Airplay Panel.  In spite of having an urban-driven playlist, the station retains its rhythmic format in order to target a multicultural audience in the Houston market.

References

External links

Urban One stations
BXX
Rhythmic contemporary radio stations in the United States
Radio stations established in 1991
1991 establishments in Texas